Taşpınar (literally "rock springs") is a Turkish place name and may refer to:

 Angolemi, a village in northern Cyprus, whose Turkish name is Taşpınar
 Taşpınar, Aksaray, a town in Aksaray Province, Turkey
 Taşpınar, Adıyaman, a town in Adıyaman Province, Turkey
 Taşpınar, Aziziye
 Taşpınar, Çorum
 Taşpınar, Çubuk, a village in Ankara Province, Turkey
 Taşpınar, Gölbaşı, a village in Ankara Province, Turkey
 Taşpınar, Polatlı, a village in Ankara Province, Turkey
 Taşpınar, Silvan
 Taşpınar, Tufanbeyli, a village in Adana Province, Turkey
 Taşpınar, Yeşilova